Arizona Mahoney is a 1936 American Western film directed by James P. Hogan and written by Stuart Anthony and Robert Yost. The film stars Joe Cook, Robert Cummings, June Martel, Buster Crabbe, Marjorie Gateson and John Miljan. It is based on the short story "Stairs of Sand" by Zane Grey. The film was released on December 4, 1936, by Paramount Pictures.

Cast 
 Joe Cook as Arizona Mahoney
 Robert Cummings as Phillip Randall
 June Martel as Sue Beatrice Bixby
 Buster Crabbe as Kirby Talbot
 Marjorie Gateson as Safroney Jones
 John Miljan as Cameron Lloyd
 Dave Chasen as Flit Smith
 Irving Bacon as Smokey
 Richard Carle as Sheriff
 Billy Lee as Kid
 Fred Kohler as Gil Blair
 James P. Burtis as Terry 
 Frank Mayo as Lefty
 Paul Newlan as Boots

Production
Cummings played the romantic lead. The film was mostly shot on location in Big Bear in November 1936.

References

External links 
 

1936 films
American black-and-white films
1930s English-language films
Films based on short fiction
Paramount Pictures films
American Western (genre) films
1936 Western (genre) films
Films based on works by Zane Grey
Films directed by James Patrick Hogan
1930s American films